Ambrosetti is an Italian surname. Notable people with the surname include:

Antonio Ambrosetti (1944–2020), Italian mathematician
Bianca Ambrosetti (1914–1929), Italian gymnast
Franco Ambrosetti (born 1941), Swiss jazz musician
Flavio Ambrosetti (1919–2012), Swiss jazz musician
Gabriele Ambrosetti (born 1973), Italian footballer and manager
Juan Bautista Ambrosetti (1865–1917), Argentine archaeologist, ethnographer and naturalist

See also
Ambrosetti Forum, an annual international economic conference held in Cernobbio, Italy

Italian-language surnames
Patronymic surnames
Surnames from given names
it:Ambrosetti